Pono is a Hawaiian word commonly rendered as "righteousness". For instance, the Hawaii state motto: Ua Mau ke Ea o ka Āina i ka Pono or "The sovereignty of the land is perpetuated in righteousness".

Pono is a notably polysemous term. Mary Kawena Pukui's and Samuel Hoyt Elbert's Hawaiian dictionary gives six meanings and 83 English translation equivalents.
 nvs. Goodness, uprightness, morality, moral qualities, correct or proper procedure, excellence, well-being, prosperity, welfare, benefit, behalf, equity, sake, true condition or nature, duty; moral, fitting, proper, righteous, right, upright, just, virtuous, fair, beneficial, successful, in perfect order, accurate, correct, eased, relieved; should, ought, must, necessary. 
 vs. Completely, properly, rightly, well, exactly, carefully, satisfactorily, much (an intensifier). 
 n. Property, resources, assets, fortune, belongings, equipment, household goods, furniture, gear of any kind, possessions, accessories, necessities.
 n. Use, purpose, plan. 
 n. Hope. 
 vs. Careless, informal, improper, any kind of (preceding a stem).

The word has strong cultural and spiritual connotations of "a state of harmony or balance", and is the aim of the Hoʻoponopono practice. Pono is often used as in affirmative prayers, especially within Kanaka Maoli healing arts and the Hawaiian Sovereignty Movement.

Footnotes

References
Chun, Malcolm Naea. 2006. Pono: The Way of Living. University of Hawaii.
Fuchs, Lawrence H. 1961. Hawaii Pono: A Social History. Harcourt, Brace & World.

Hawaiiana
Hawaiian words and phrases